Solomon Christopher Thomas (born August 26, 1995) is an American football defensive tackle for the New York Jets of the National Football League (NFL). He played college football at Stanford and was drafted third overall by the San Francisco 49ers in the 2017 NFL Draft.

Early years
Thomas was born in Chicago, Illinois, on August 26, 1995. Thomas and his family moved to Sydney, Australia when he was two years old, where he lived for five years. He attended Coppell High School in Coppell, Texas. He had 78 tackles and 12.5 sacks as a senior and 89 tackles with 8.5 sacks as a junior. He was rated as a four-star recruit and was ranked among the top players in his class. He committed to Stanford University to play college football.

College career
After redshirting his first year at Stanford in 2014, Thomas played in all 14 games in 2015, starting six, and had 39 total tackles, 10.5 tackles-for-loss, and 3.5 sacks. In recognition of his successful 2015 season, he was named as an honorable mention All-Pac-12 selection. In 2016, Thomas played and started all 13 games and had 62 total tackles with 15.0 TFL and 8.0 sacks. Thomas was named first team All-Pac-12 and won the Morris Trophy. Following the 2016 season, Thomas declared his intentions to enter the 2017 NFL Draft.

Professional career

Combine
Coming out of Stanford, Thomas was projected to be a first round pick by the majority of analysts and scouts. He was invited to the NFL Scouting Combine, but only chose to participate in the bench, 40-yard dash, vertical, and broad jump. On March 23, 2017, Thomas attended Stanford's pro day, but opted to stand on his combine numbers and only performed positional drills. He was ranked the second best defensive end (behind Myles Garrett) by NFLDraftScout.com, ESPN, and Sports Illustrated.

San Francisco 49ers
Thomas was drafted third overall by the San Francisco 49ers in the 2017 NFL Draft. He became the third consecutive defensive end drafted in the first round by the 49ers, joining Arik Armstead (2015) and DeForest Buckner (2016). The man who drafted Thomas—newly appointed 49ers general manager John Lynch—coincidentally studied alongside Thomas as a mature student while working as a broadcaster for FOX Sports, and counselled Thomas to leave Stanford without knowing he would be in a position to draft him as a member of the 49ers front office the following season.

On July 28, 2017, the San Francisco 49ers signed Thomas to a fully guaranteed four-year, $28.14 million contract that includes a signing bonus of $18.61 million. He played in 14 games as a rookie with 12 starts, recording 41 tackles and three sacks.

On May 1, 2020, the 49ers declined the fifth-year option on Thomas' contract, making him a free agent in 2021. During the 49ers' Week 2 matchup against the New York Jets, Thomas suffered a torn ACL and was ruled out for the rest of the season.

Las Vegas Raiders
Thomas signed a one-year contract with the Las Vegas Raiders on March 19, 2021. He played in all 17 games, recording 34 tackles, 3.5 sacks, and two forced fumbles.

New York Jets
On March 30, 2022, Thomas signed with the New York Jets. He was named a backup defensive tackle behind Quinnen Williams, Sheldon Rankins, and Nathan Shepherd. He played in all 17 games, recording 26 tackles, while playing 33% of snaps.

Thomas re-signed with the Jets on March 18, 2023.

References

External links

Las Vegas Raiders bio
Stanford Cardinal bio

1995 births
Living people
American football defensive ends
American football defensive tackles
Las Vegas Raiders players
People from Coppell, Texas
Players of American football from Chicago
Players of American football from Texas
San Francisco 49ers players
Sportspeople from the Dallas–Fort Worth metroplex
Stanford Cardinal football players
New York Jets players
Ed Block Courage Award recipients